Bouck is a surname. Notable people with the surname include:

 Gabriel Bouck (1828–1904), American Representative from Wisconsin
   John C. Bouck (1931–2010), Supreme Court of British Columbia justice
 Joseph Bouck (1788–1858), American Representative from New York
 Lyle Bouck (1923–2016), American soldier
 Tyler Bouck (born 1980), Canadian hockey player
 William C. Bouck (1786–1859), American politician from New York

See also
Bouck's Falls
Bouck's Island